Brindley Cecil John Bettington (2 September 1898 – 26 August 1931) was an Australian cricketer. He played first-class cricket for New South Wales and Oxford University.

See also
 List of New South Wales representative cricketers
 List of Oxford University Cricket Club players

References

External links
 

1898 births
1931 deaths
Australian cricketers
New South Wales cricketers
Oxford University cricketers
People from Parramatta
Alumni of New College, Oxford